The Beloved is a 2015 Chinese suspense romance film directed by Cao Dawei. It was released on May 15, 2015 in China.

Cast
Wang Likun
Kim Bum
Joe Cheng
Guan Yu
Li Haoyu
Zhang Cheng 
Jiang Peiyan 
Toby Lee

Reception
By May 15, the film had grossed  at the Chinese box office.

References

2015 romance films
Chinese romance films
Chinese suspense films
2010s Mandarin-language films